Knefastia decipiens is an extinct species of sea snail, a marine gastropod mollusk in the family Pseudomelatomidae, the turrids and allies.

Description
The length of the shell attains 20 mm.

Distribution
This extinct marine species was found in Eocene strata in the Paris basin, France.

References

 Deshayes, 1865  Description des animaux sans vertèbres, etc., t. III, fasc. 2, in-4°, Paris, 1865. p. 363, pl. LXXXVII, fig. 19, 20.
 Cossmann (M.) & Pissarro (G.), 1913 - Iconographie complète des coquilles fossiles de l'Éocène des environs de Paris, t. 2, p. pp. 46–65
 Le Renard (J.) & Pacaud (J.-M.), 1995 - Révision des Mollusques paléogènes du Bassin de Paris. 2 - Liste des références primaires des espèces. Cossmanniana, t. 3, vol. 3, pp. 65–132 (

External links
 MNHN, Paris: Knefastia decipiens

decipiens
Gastropods described in 1865